The discography of British singer Estelle consists of five studio albums, five extended plays, twenty-three singles (including nineteen as a featured artist), and six promotional singles.

Estelle released her debut studio album The 18th Day  on 18 October 2004 through V2 Records, followed by a re-release 4 April 2005. The album peaked at number 35 on the UK Albums chart. It Includes the hit singles "1980", "Free" and "Go Gone", all of which reached the Top 40 on the UK Singles Chart.

Her second studio album Shine was released on 31 March 2008 through Atlantic Records and was preceded by the lead single "Wait a Minute (Just a Touch)" in November 2007. The album's second single, "American Boy", became a number one hit in the UK, as well as reaching the top 10 and receiving platinum status in many countries. It also earned Estelle her first three Grammy Award nominations (including Song of the Year) and won Best Rap/Sung Collaboration. "American Boy" was followed by her last song to reach the Top 40 in the UK to date, "No Substitute Love, and the singles "Pretty Please (Love Me)" and "Come Over" Shine has been certified Gold in the UK, as well peaking at number 6 in the UK and becoming her first and only album to chart internationally.

Estelle followed Shine with All of Me on 28 February 2012, which featured the singles "Freak", her last song to chart in the UK, "Fall in Love", the Grammy-nominated "Thank You", and "Break My Heart", the latter two charting in the top 40 of the US Billboard Hot R&B/Hip-Hop Songs chart.

Her fourth studio album True Romance was released on 17 November 2015 through her own record label 1980 Recordings, as well as BMG. Her song "Conqueror" (originally a duet with Jussie Smollett from the American television show Empire) peaked at number 42 in the United States.

Her fifth studio album Lovers Rock was released on 7 September 2018 through 1980 Records and VP Records, making it her first album as an independent artist. The album also marked a shift in Estelle's musical style from pop, R&B, and hip hop to reggae.

Studio albums

Extended plays

Singles

As lead artist

As featured artist

Promotional singles

Guest appearances

Notes

References

Discographies of British artists
Hip hop discographies
Rhythm and blues discographies
Soul music discographies